The Ministry of Justice of Bosnia and Herzegovina is the governmental department which oversees the judiciary body of Bosnia and Herzegovina.

History
Following the independence of Bosnia and Herzegovina in 1992, the Ministry of Justice of the Republic of Bosnia and Herzegovina began to operate from the Socialist Federal Republic of Yugoslavia (SFRY) at the level of the newly established Republic of Bosnia and Herzegovina. After the end of the Bosnian War, and the signing of the Dayton Agreement, the Ministry of Justice of the Federation of Bosnia and Herzegovina and the Ministry of Justice of the Republika Srpska started functioning for the judiciary in Bosnia and Herzegovina.

By 2008, the entity Ministries of Justice were responsible for the jurisdiction of the judiciary in Bosnia and Herzegovina. Following the 2006 Bosnian general election and the formation of a new government in Bosnia and Herzegovina, the Ministry of Justice of Bosnia and Herzegovina began functioning for the judiciary in Bosnia and Herzegovina.

Responsibilities
The Ministry of Justice has the authority to administer the following judicial institutions at the level of Bosnia and Herzegovina:

Court Police of Bosnia and Herzegovina
Court of Bosnia and Herzegovina
Constitutional Court of Bosnia and Herzegovina
Prosecutor's Office of Bosnia and Herzegovina

List of ministers

Ministers of Justice of Bosnia and Herzegovina (2002–present)

Political parties:

See also
Ministry of Justice
Justice minister
Politics of Bosnia and Herzegovina

References

External links

Justice ministries
Justice
Justice
Bosnia and Herzegovina, Justice